Geshe Kelsang Wangmo is a German-born Buddhist nun, scholar, and teacher. She is the first woman to be awarded a Geshe title, considered equivalent to a Ph.D. in Buddhist philosophy.

Early life
She was raised in a Roman Catholic family in Lohmar, a small town between Cologne and Bonn in Germany. During her childhood, she attended church but grew uninterested in religion in her teens. After completing high school in 1989, she went on a backpacking trip. Travelling through Israel (where she stayed on a kibbutz), Turkey, Cyprus, Thailand, Indonesia, and Japan, she reached India. After visiting Kolkata, Varanasi, and Manali, she landed in Dharamshala. She had planned to stay for a couple of weeks before returning to start university, studying medicine. But eventually, she stayed on.

Conversion to Buddhism
She joined an introduction to Buddhism course at Tushita Meditation Centre, at Dharamkot above McLeod Ganj in Himachal Pradesh. She went on to study Buddhism seriously. Her studies started in McLeod Ganj, and after completing several courses and attended teaching by different Tibetan Lamas, she had developed great faith in Tibetan Buddhism and wanted to become a nun.

She took ordination as a nun in April 1991. She later enrolled in the traditional geshe curriculum (a 17-year course) at the Institute of Buddhist Dialectics (IBD) in Dharamshala. This curriculum is based on the Drepung Loseling Monastery and studies different topics, scriptures, and tradition over the course of a couple years at a time. Each year she had to take written and debate exams, and in the last few years three or four and a thesis in Tibetan. In an interview with FPMT, she states that she had an advantage as a lot of her peers were already very advanced, which made her learn a lot from them in debates, as she knew very little Tibetan and had no experience in debate. Also, she mentions that the first ten years were very hard for her due to the language barrier and cultural differences. However, the joy of the studies kept her going. In 2009 she handed in her thesis, only she could not participate in the final Geshe exam as this was held in the Drepung Loseling Monastery, which is not open to nuns. In April 2011, the IBD conferred the degree of geshe, a Tibetan Buddhist academic degree for monastics, on her, thus making her the world's first female geshe.  

Since 2004, she has been teaching Buddhist philosophy classes in English in Dharamsala, following the curriculum of the IBD.

First Geshema 
Kelsang Wangmo made history by being the first women to graduate from a Geshe exam in 2011, and therefore achieve the Geshe(ma) title. 

Up until 2011 it was not possible for women to participate in Geshe exams as these were held in monasteries, therefore, women could not acquire the title of Geshe(ma). However, movement is brought within this tradition, regarding gender relations. In April 2011, history was written as the permission by the Dalai Lama and the Ministry for Religion and Culture was granted to receive the Geshe degree. Up until 2016 she was the only female to have completed the exam. Now, there have been more than hundred Geshema's who have completed the exam.

Gender inequality 
In the Buddhist world, specifically, the Tibetan Buddhist space, there is a male orientation, which is embodied into everyday practice and institutionalized within organization. More specifically, there is educational inequality with regard to gender differences, within this world. In the monastic world, women have been inferior to men since the time of the Buddha Siddhartha Gautama. According to the traditional hierarchy, women are subordinate to men. Some senior Buddhists believe that if this value of seniority and gender subordination needs to be followed for the community to be harmonious. Leveling gender equality is regarded by these devout believers as a threat to the harmony and lineage of the tradition. Therefore, the actions of nuns are controlled, and their independence is confined, which has a solid impact on the educational opportunities that nuns have within this tradition. This can be seen for example in the eight behavioral rules, the Eight Garundhammas (lci-ba'i chos), for monastic etiquette and only apply to females, not to monks. These rules also state how nuns need to be supervised by monks, and can only seek higher education from bhikshus.

full ordination 
The Tibetan Nuns Project Newsletter states that one of the most substantial discussions that is being held is introducing full ordination for nuns within the Tibetan Buddhist tradition. This has been a topic of interest for many years, and it has been the Dalai Lama's top concern. However, this issue is historically complex as it has a clause in the ordination rules that prevents females to be fully ordained; it states that the lineage (of the person giving the ordination) needs to be linked directly back to the Buddha himself, however, there has been no evidence that bhikshuni ordination was ever introduced into Tibet. The presumably non-existent bhikshuni lineage needs to be present at the ordination, otherwise the ordination cannot be granted. The re-establishment of the ordination must follow the tradition of the Mulasarvastivada Vinaya, and up until current times the importance in preserving the lineages has priority over the nuns being able to be fully ordained. This draws on the macro debate of tradition versus change in which the perseverance of tradition is weighed against bringing in policy change. Other forces, such as politics, pride, gender bias, and generational conflict all have an impact on the progress of this topic. A macro factor that is at play is politics, which leads to the conservation of traditional culture on global and societal scale. Also, on a micro level pride of culture a tradition can play a role as this feeling can be embodied within an individual which can cause some resistance for the transmission of a different lineage. In addition, gender bias can contribute to the resistance for change, as the traditional social hierarchy will be altered. Another explanation can be generational conflicts that can arise since the current leaders are the first generation who left in the 1950's and have put in tremendous effort to preserve their culture, thus, the next generation will have a better opportunity to constitute large change. 

However, progress is being made with regard to the full ordination of women, progressive ideas are being discussed with the Dalai Lama, and there is a growing support for full female ordination. One of the organizations that advocate strongly for ordination to progress is the Tibetan Nuns Project. This organization gives women full access to education by providing facilities and education for nuns in exile, educated female teachers for the community, and establishing self-sufficient nurseries, thereby stimulating opportunities for women while still preserving the Tibetan culture.

Debate 
Another way in which gender inequality has been observed, is the practice of debate that is very important within the Tibetan Buddhist tradition as it creates understanding for the philosophy and is needed to qualify as a teacher of the tradition. This practice was only accessible to monks and was made available for women in the 1990's.

Geshe(ma) exams 
Furthermore, nuns could not participate in the Geshe exam to receive the title of Geshe(ma) until the Dalai Lama changed this in 2011, after the Great Prayer Festival in Dharamsala where he acknowledged the nuns' high level of knowledge. After this event, there was a meeting assembled by the Department of Religion and Culture of the Central Tibetan Administration which invited abbots, scholars, and representatives. In this meeting it was decided that it was time to grant women this opportunity. The Geshe exam is a scholastic degree that requires at least nineteen years of studying the Five Great Canonical Texts to complete. These exams were only available for monks as these exams were being given in monasteries. Since 2011, women do have the opportunity to prove their qualifications and this highest form of degree has been accessible to women. This creates movement towards achieving equal academic standing.

These exams are important as the students develop the quality of deeper realization and debating skills. In addition, it is important that this degree is accessible to nuns as it gives them the opportunity to participate in leadership roles. 

According to Geshe Thubten Wangchen, the graduation of a Geshe means that karmic imprints to take rebirth in Shambhala can be realized. Therefore, this degree implies that a Geshe knows virtue, what needs to be practiced and abandoned The Geshe degree is the highest form of scholarly degree that can be attained in this tradition, which ensures that only the best students are eligible to take the Geshe exam.

The exam consists of ten days of written tests about various subjects, together with debate sessions. All the knowledge and practice that have been acquired over the two last decades is tested in this ten-day period.

Leveling gender inequality 
This could be coined as a new beginning. The advice that the Geshema gives to nuns is to go on with what they are doing and do the same the monks are doing. She states "If I can do it, anyone can do it".

The event of Kelsang Wangmo becoming the first geshema has written history, and prompts a new period in which gender inequality is leveled, and nuns have the opportunity to excel within the education system and take positions of teachers and leaders, which were previously occupied by monks. In addition, Geshema Kelsang Wangmo explains that this event was somewhat controversial, it has been influential in paving the way for the ability of nunneries to provide Geshe degree's for nuns. This shows how the story of Geshema Kelsang Wangmo contributed to the leveling of gender inequality, as barriers have been broken.

In another way, these changes together with the formation and development of higher educational institutes for nuns, can demonstrate to be the beginning of a much bigger movement. For example, progress is now being made on the topic of full ordination for women within the Tibetan Buddhist tradition.

References

External links
The Joy of Study: An Interview with Geshe Kelsang Wangmo

Year of birth missing (living people)
Living people
German Buddhists
German Buddhist nuns
Converts to Buddhism
Tibetan Buddhist spiritual teachers
20th-century Buddhist nuns
21st-century Buddhist nuns
Geshes